The Jolly Express is a cargo ship operated by Messina Line between Tunis, Naples and Genoa. It was previously operated by Toll Shipping and Brambles Shipping in Australia as the Tasmanian Achiever.

History
The Jolly Express was built by Samsung Heavy Industries as the Tasmanian Achiever for Brambles Shipping for use on Bass Strait services between Melbourne and Burnie, along with sister ship Victorian Reliance. The ship was acquired by Toll Shipping with the Brambles shipping business in 2002.

It was extended by 32 metres to 184 metres in Singapore in 2004. When CMA CGM, parent company of Australian National Line, withdrew the Bass Trader from the Melbourne to Bell Bay route in 2009, it entered into a joint venture to transfer cargo to the Toll ships. As such it carried both Toll and ANL logos.

In March 2019 it was replaced by the larger Tasmanian Achiever II. It was sold to Messina Line, renamed Jolly Express and began operating on the Mediterranean Sea between Tunis, Naples and Genoa.

References

External links

Container ships
Ro-ro ships
Ships built by Samsung Heavy Industries
Ships built in Geoje
Toll Group
1999 ships